The Cathedral-Basilica of Our Crowned Mother of Palmar is a basilica church in El Palmar de Troya, Spain. The church, dedicated to the Virgin Mary under the title of Our Lady of Palmar, serves as the only cathedral and 'Mother church' for the Palmarian Christian Church, a schismatic Independent Catholic denomination not in communion with the Vatican.

History 
The cathedral sits on the location of reported apparitions of Our Lady of Palmar. Construction on the church began in 1978 and was finished in 2014. The church was built as a "Spanish Vatican" for the Pope of the Palmarian Christian Church, a Traditionalist Catholic church which broke away from the Roman Catholic Church in the 1970s.

Inside the cathedral there are fifteen chapels dedicated to the Holy Family, the Holy Trinity, St. Francis of Assisi, the Souls in Purgatory, Our Lady of Perpetual Help, Ignatius of Loyola, Christ the King, the Blessed Sacrament, the Queen of Heaven, Saint Dominic, Thérèse of Lisieux, the Nativity of Mary, St. Joseph, Elijah, and Padre Pio.

In July 2016 a fire broke out on the church grounds.

References 

Basilica churches in Spain
Buildings and structures in Seville
Cathedrals in Spain
Catholic cathedrals in Europe
Independent Catholic church buildings
Shrines to the Virgin Mary